Hideyoshi Kagawa (born 14 August 1987) is a Japanese karateka. He won the silver medal in the men's kumite +84 kg event at the 2014 Asian Games in Incheon, South Korea. In the final, he lost against Rashed Al-Mutairi of Kuwait.

In 2017, he won the gold medal in the men's kumite +84 kg event at the World Games held in Wrocław, Poland. In the final, he defeated Sajjad Ganjzadeh of Iran.

At the 2019 Asian Karate Championships held in Tashkent, Uzbekistan, he won the silver medal in the men's kumite +84 kg event. In the final, he lost against Tareg Hamedi of Saudi Arabia.

Achievements

References 

Living people
1987 births
Place of birth missing (living people)
Japanese male karateka
World Games medalists in karate
World Games gold medalists
Competitors at the 2017 World Games
Karateka at the 2014 Asian Games
Medalists at the 2014 Asian Games
Asian Games medalists in karate
Asian Games silver medalists for Japan
21st-century Japanese people